Wilbur Virgil Hubbard (died c. 1986) was an American football, basketball, baseball, and golf coach.

Playing career

San Jose State
Hubbard was an outstanding athlete at San Jose State University. He lettered four times as a quarterback in football and four times as a guard on the school's basketball team.

Stanford
He transferred to Stanford University in 1930 with the hopes of playing on the school's football team, but he was ruled ineligible due to playing for four years at San Jose State.

Coaching career
He returned to his San Jose State to coach a number of sports, including being the head football (1947–1949), basketball (1935–1940, 1944–1945), and baseball coach.

Perhaps his most notable achievement was leading the San Jose State men's golf team to a national championship in 1948.

Head coaching record

Football

References

Year of birth missing
1986 deaths
American football quarterbacks
Guards (basketball)
San Jose State Spartans athletic directors
San Jose State Spartans baseball coaches
San Jose State Spartans football coaches
San Jose State Spartans football players
San Jose State Spartans men's basketball coaches
San Jose State Spartans men's basketball players
College golf coaches in the United States